The New Zealand national netball team, commonly known as the Silver Ferns, represent Netball New Zealand in international netball tournaments such as the Netball World Cup, the Commonwealth Games, the Taini Jamison Trophy, the Constellation Cup, the Netball Quad Series and the Fast5 Netball World Series. They have also represented New Zealand at the World Games. New Zealand made their Test debut in 1938. As of 2023, New Zealand have been world champions on five occasions and Commonwealth champions twice. They are regularly ranked number two in the World Netball Rankings.

History

Formation and early years 
On 20 August 1938, New Zealand, captained by Margaret Matangi, made their test debut in an away match against at Australia at Royal Park, Melbourne. Australia defeated New Zealand 40–11. This was the first netball Test between Australia and New Zealand. It was also the world's first international netball match. On 20 August 1948, New Zealand, captained by Oonah Shannahan, hosted their first home test against Australia at Forbury Park. Australia defeated New Zealand 27–16.

Rivalry with Australia
New Zealand's main rivals in international netball are Australia. Between 1963 and 2015, the two teams dominated the World Netball Championships and Commonwealth Games tournaments. Since 2010 the two teams have also competed for the Constellation Cup. Notable and memorable clashes have included the finals of the 1991, 1999 and 2011 World Netball Championships, the finals of the 2010 and the 2014 Commonwealth Games and the final match of the 2013 Constellation Cup.

Tournament history

Netball World Cup
New Zealand have competed at every World Netball Championships and/or Netball World Cup since the inaugural 1963 tournament. At the 1963 tournament, New Zealand were captained by Pamela Edwards, with Lois Muir as vice-captain. Australia defeated New Zealand 37–36 in a closely contested final. After winning the 1967 World Netball Championships, New Zealand were world champions for the first time. The  team was coached by Taini Jamison and captained by Judy Blair. In the final they beat Australia 40–43. Joan Harnett emerged as the star for New Zealand and was named player of the tournament. In 1996 the team was inducted into the New Zealand Sports Hall of Fame. 

At the 1979 World Netball Championships, New Zealand shared the gold medal with Australia and Trinidad and Tobago. After winning the 1987 World Netball Championships, with a team coached by Lois Muir and captained by Leigh Gibbs, New Zealand were world champions for a third time. New Zealand were dominant in group play, winning all eight matches. That saw them advance to a final round with Australia, England and Trinidad and Tobago. New Zealand were the only team to win all three of their games and were subsequently declared world champions. In 1996, the 1987 team was also  inducted into the New Zealand Sports Hall of Fame.

At the 2003 World Netball Championships, with a team captained by Anna Rowberry, New Zealand won their fourth title. In the final they defeated Australia 49–47. At the 2003 Halberg Awards, the Silver Ferns won both the main award and were named Team of the Year. Their head coach, Ruth Aitken, was named Coach of the Year and Irene van Dyk, who scored 41 from 43 in the final, was named Sportswoman of the Year.

New Zealand were world champions for a fifth time when, with a team captained by Laura Langman and featuring Casey Kopua and Maria Folau, they won the 2019 Netball World Cup. In just fourteen months, head coach Noeline Taurua turned a team, demoralised at missing out on a medal at the 2018 Commonwealth Games, into world champions. New Zealand rebounded from a round robin defeat to Australia to  defeat them 52–51 in the final. At the 2019 Halberg Awards, the Silver Ferns won both the Halberg Award Supreme and were named Team of the Year. Winning the 2019 Netball World Cup was declared New Zealand's Favourite Sports Moment and  Taurua, was named Coach of the Year. The team were also awarded the 2019 Lonsdale Cup.

World Games
Between 1985 and 1993, New Zealand competed at the World Games, winning two gold and one silver medals. With a team captained by Lyn Parker, New Zealand defeated Australia 39–37 in the final to win the inaugural title. At the 1989 tournament, a New Zealand team captained by Waimarama Taumaunu, defeated Australia 33–29. At the 1989 Halberg Awards, the Silver Ferns were named Team of the Year and their head coach, Lyn Parker, was named Coach of the Year.

Commonwealth Games
New Zealand has competed at every netball tournament at the Commonwealth Games. In 1990 they lost to Australia in a one-off match when netball was a demonstration sport. Between 1998 and 2014 they played in every tournament final, winning two gold and three silver medals. In 2006 New Zealand won the gold medal for the first time with a 60–55 win over Australia. In 2010, New Zealand, led by Maria Tutaia and Irene van Dyk, won their second gold medal after they defeated Australia 66–64 in an epic encounter. Tutaia scored the winning goal in double extra time after 84 minutes of play. The Silver Ferns were also awarded the 2010 Lonsdale Cup.

Taini Jamison Trophy
Since 2008, Netball New Zealand has hosted the Taini Jamison Trophy. The trophy is contested with visiting teams, other than Australia. Teams to compete have included England, Jamaica, South Africa, Malawi, Fiji and Samoa.

Constellation Cup
Since 2010, New Zealand and Australia have competed for the Constellation Cup. New Zealand won the trophy for the first time in 2012 and for a second time in 2021.

Netball Quad Series
Since 2016, New Zealand have competed in the Netball Quad Series, playing against Australia,  England and South Africa. The Silver Ferns won their first Quad Series title in September 2017. In 2020, the Quad Series was briefly replaced by a Nations Cup tournament. New Zealand won this tournament.

Fast5 Netball World Series
Since 2009, the Fast5 Ferns have played in the Fast5 Netball World Series. They have been the dominant team in the series. Between 2009 and 2018, they won seven of the nine tournaments played.

Players

Current team

Notable past players

Most-capped internationals

New Zealand Sports Hall of Fame
The following New Zealand netball internationals have been inducted into the New Zealand Sports Hall of Fame.

Selected captains
The following New Zealand netball internationals captained the team when they won the gold medal at  the Netball World Cup, the Commonwealth Games and  the World Games.

Head coaches

Honours

World Netball Championships/Netball World Cup
Winners: 1967, 1979, 1987, 2003, 2019: 5
Runners up: 1963, 1971, 1975, 1983, 1991, 1995, 1999, 2007, 2011, 2015: 10 
Commonwealth Games
Winners: 2006, 2010: 3 
Runners Up: 1998, 2002, 2014: 3
Taini Jamison Trophy
Winners: 2008, 2010, 2011, 2012, 2013, 2014, 2015, 2016, 2017, 2020, 2022: 2 
Runners Up: 2009, 2018, 2021 : 3   
Constellation Cup
Winners: 2012, 2021: 2 
Runners Up: 2010, 2011, 2013, 2014, 2015, 2016, 2017, 2018, 2019, 2022: 10   
Netball Quad Series
Winners: 2017 (August/September), 2020: 2 
Runners Up: 2016, 2017 (January/February), 2023 : 3
World Games
Winners: 1985, 1989: 2
Runners up: 1993: 1
Fast5 Netball World Series
Winners: 2009, 2010, 2012, 2013, 2014, 2016, 2018: 6 
Runners up: 2011,
Lonsdale Cup
Winners: 2010, 2019: 2
Halberg Awards – Supreme Award
Winners: 2003, 2019: 2
Halberg Awards – Team of the Year
Winners: 1989, 2003, 2019: 3
New Zealand Sports Hall of Fame
Inductees: 1967, 1987: 2

References

External links 
 Official team website

 
 
National netball teams of Oceania
netball